The following is a list of notable events and releases that happened in 1996 in music in South Korea.

Debuting and disbanded in 1996

Debuting
Clon
Goofy
H.O.T.
Onnine Ibalgwan

Solo debuts
Lee Ji-hoon
Yangpa
Lee Ki-chan
Yoo Chae-yeong

Disbanded groups
Seo Taiji and Boys
Two Two

Releases in 1996

January

February

March

April

May

June

July

August

September

October

November

December

Deaths
Kim Kwang-seok, aged 31. Singer, former member of Dongmulwon.

References

 
South Korean music
K-pop